Ekaterina Abramia (born August 25, 1979 in Tbilisi) is a Georgian rhythmic gymnast.

Abramia competed for Georgia in the rhythmic gymnastics individual all-around competition at the 1996 Summer Olympics in Atlanta. There she was 25th in the qualification round and did not advance to the semifinal.

References

External links 
 
 

1979 births
Living people
Rhythmic gymnasts from Georgia (country)
Gymnasts at the 1996 Summer Olympics
Olympic gymnasts of Georgia (country)
Sportspeople from Tbilisi